Egypt Railway may refer to:
Egypt Railway (North Carolina), 1892–1910, a predecessor of the original Norfolk Southern Railway
Egyptian National Railways